The 39th Filmfare Awards South Ceremony honouring the winners of the best of South Indian cinema in 1991 is an event held on 31 March 1993 along with Bollywood Filmfare Awards was an event held at the Bombay City.

Awards

Main awards

Kannada cinema

Malayalam cinema

Tamil cinema

Telugu cinema

Awards Presentation

 Vishwa Sagar (Best Film Kannada) Received Award from Govind Nihalani
 G. Jayakumar (Best Film Malayalam)  Received Award from Ashok Thakeria
 K. Balu (Best Film Tamil) Received Award from Umesh Mehra
 Lokesh (Best Director Kannada) Received Award from Bindu
 Kranthi Kumar (Best Director Telugu) Received Award from Asha Sachdev
 Mani Ratnam (Best Director Tamil) Received Award from Jaya Bachchan
 Mukul Anand Received Amala Award (Best Actress Malayalam) from Ashwini Bhave
 Malashri (Best Actress Kannada) Received Award from Poonam Dhillon
 Sridevi (Best Actress Telugu) Received Award from Madhuri Dixit
 Gautami (Best Actress Tamil) Received Award from Aamir Khan
 Mammootty (Best Actor Malayalam) Received Award from Rekha
 Mukul Anand Received Akkineni Nageswara Rao Award (Best Actor Telugu) from Anupam Kher
 Kamal Haasan (Best Actor Tamil) Received Award from Juhi Chawla

References

 Filmfare Magazine May 1993

External links
 
 

Filmfare Awards South
1991 Indian film awards